Touched is a Canadian psychological thriller film, directed by Karl R. Hearne and released in 2017.

The film stars Hugh Thompson as Gabriel, a man who works as a superintendent for an apartment building in Montreal. After one of his tenants goes missing, he finds a young girl (Lola Flanery) still living in her empty apartment. According to Hearne, part of the goal was to make a film "where the audience is not sure what kind of film they’re watching. Is this an abduction film? Is this a horror film? Is this an arthouse drama?"

The film debuted on the international film festival circuit in 2017, before making its Canadian theatrical debut in 2018.

The film was nominated for the John Dunning Best First Feature Award at the 7th Canadian Screen Awards in 2019.

References

External links 
 

2017 films
2017 psychological thriller films
Canadian psychological thriller films
English-language Canadian films
Films set in Montreal
Films shot in Montreal
Quebec films
2010s English-language films
2010s Canadian films